Aristides Kalantzakis ( April 10, 1928 – February 26, 2017) was a Greek politician and member of the New Democracy party. Kalantzakis served in the Hellenic Parliament, representing the Messenia constituency, from 1958 to 1967 and 1974 to 1996. His portfolios as a New Democracy government minister included the now defunct Minister for Trade from 1980 to 1981 and Minister of Labor from 1990 to 1993.

Kalantzakis studied law at the University of Athens. He then continued his studies in Paris and Nancy, France. He was first elected to the Hellenic Parliament in the 1958 legislative election, representing Messenia, and won re-election in 1961, 1963, and 1964. He then briefly held the position of Deputy Finance Minister from April 4, 1967, until April 21, 1967, when a coup installed the Greek military junta of 1967–74.

In 1974, the military junta ended, allowing for the 1974 Greek legislative election in which Kalantzakis returned to Parliament. He was re-elected to the Hellenic Parliament in the 1977, 1981, 1985, June 1989, November 1989, 1990 and 1993 legislative elections. Kalantzakis served as the Deputy Minister of Coordination and Planning in the Konstantinos Karamanlis government from September 10, 1976 until October 21, 1977. He also held the portfolios of Minister for Trade from October 11, 1980 until October 21, 1981, and Minister of Labor from April 11, 1990 until October 13, 1993.

Aristides Kalantzakis died on February 26, 2017, at the age of 89.

References

1928 births
2017 deaths
Labour ministers of Greece
Government ministers of Greece
Greek MPs 1958–1961
Greek MPs 1961–1963
Greek MPs 1963–1964
Greek MPs 1964–1967
Greek MPs 1974–1977
Greek MPs 1977–1981
Greek MPs 1981–1985
Greek MPs 1985–1989
Greek MPs 1989 (June–November)
Greek MPs 1989–1990
Greek MPs 1990–1993
Greek MPs 1993–1996
New Democracy (Greece) politicians
National and Kapodistrian University of Athens alumni
People from Kyparissia